Love Is the Message may refer to:

 Love Is the Message (MFSB album) or the title song, 1973
 Love Is the Message (Misia album), 2000
 "Love Is the Message" (Pose), 2018 television episode
 Love Is the Message, The Message Is Death, 2016 film by Arthur Jafa